Winnowing barns (or winnowing houses) were structures commonly found in South Carolina on antebellum rice plantations. A winnowing barn consists of a large shed on tall posts with a hole in the floor. Raw, husked rice was carried up into the barn by slaves and then the grain was dropped through the hole. As the grain dropped to the ground, the lighter and undesirable chaff was carried away in the wind, leaving a mound of purified rice grains directly below the winnowing barn. The purified grain was then packed into barrels and carried down river to port cities for distribution.

Prior to the development of the winnowing barn, winnowing was done by hand using winnowing baskets — a long and labor-intensive process. Thus, the development of the winnowing barn helped South Carolina become the second largest exporter of rice in the world, next to Indonesia and the Far East.

See also
Rice hulls
Rice huller
Rice pounder
Rice barn

References

External links

Photo of Mansfield plantation winnowing house, Library of Congress

Mansfield Plantation website

Barns in South Carolina
Antebellum architecture